The Manitoba School for the Deaf is a provincial school in Winnipeg, Manitoba with both residential and day programs serving deaf and hard-of-hearing students.

The school teaches both elementary and secondary students, using Bilingual-Bicultural method.

Student population is approximately 40 students in the senior school and 60 in the elementary school.

Deaf students from Canada often attend Gallaudet University in Washington D.C. for post secondary programs.
Some Deaf students attend at University of Manitoba for post secondary programs

References

External links
 

Schools for the deaf in Canada
Special schools in Canada